The 2010 Pittsburgh Steelers season was the team's 78th season as a professional sports franchise and as a member of the National Football League (NFL), the eleventh season under the leadership of general manager Kevin Colbert, and the fourth under head coach Mike Tomlin.

They reached Super Bowl XLV for the franchise's 8th Super Bowl appearance, but lost to the Green Bay Packers 31–25.

The Steelers allowed the fewest points in the NFL in 2010, with 232 (14.5 points per game).

As of 2023, the only remaining active members of the 2010 Pittsburgh Steelers are defensive back Crezdon Butler and defensive lineman Steve McLendon, although they are both free agents.

Off-season 
In 2009, the Steelers had finished with a 9–7 record in a tie for second place in the AFC North, falling short of the Playoffs. The Steelers played all of their home games at Heinz Field in Pittsburgh, Pennsylvania.

The off-season was marked by the trade of Santonio Holmes, and the six-game suspension (then reduced to four games) of quarterback Ben Roethlisberger for off-the-field issues.

The team did not re-sign free agent running back Willie Parker, who had been with the team since 2004. They added receiver Antwaan Randle El and linebacker Larry Foote, who were both with the team for their Super Bowl XL victory.

Coaching staff and front-office changes 
Coaching staff turnover
The disappointing outcome of the 2009 season brought about the first significant changes in the team's coaching staff since the hiring of Mike Tomlin in 2007.
Offensive line coach Larry Zierlein and special teams coordinator Bob Ligashesky were dismissed on January 6, 2010.  Additionally, quarterbacks coach Ken Anderson announced his retirement on January 5, 2010.  All three men had served in the same roles for the three years since Tomlin assembled his initial staff.

Defensive quality control coach Lou Spanos left to become the linebackers coach for the Washington Redskins.  Spanos had been on the defensive coaching staff since 1995.  Jerry Olsavsky was hired to replace Spanos.  Olsavsky had coached linebackers at Youngstown State University for the previous seven seasons following a ten-year NFL career as a linebacker, primarily with the Steelers.

Sean Kugler was hired to replace Zierlein as the offensive line coach.  Kugler had until recently served in a similar capacity with the Buffalo Bills.

Al Everest filled the vacancy as special teams coordinator left by Ligashesky's dismissal.  Everest has nearly 40 years of professional and college coaching experience, including the last fourteen coaching special teams for three NFL clubs.  He served most recently as the special teams coach of the San Francisco 49ers.  In  Everest was named the NFL's Special Teams Coach of the Year for his work with the New Orleans Saints.

Randy Fichtner stepped into the quarterbacks coach post vacated by Anderson's retirement. Scottie Montgomery was hired as the new wide receivers coach. Montgomery had coached receivers at his alma mater, Duke University, for the past four seasons, following an NFL and Arena Football playing career.

Front office changes
The team lost pro scouting coordinator Doug Whaley who left to become the assistant general manager of the Buffalo Bills. Whaley had been in his position with the Steelers since . He spent the previous two seasons as a scout with the Houston Texans.

Roethlisberger suspension 
NFL Commissioner Roger Goodell announced in April that Steelers quarterback Ben Roethlisberger will be suspended for up to six games for violating the NFL's personal conduct policy. The commissioner also ordered Roethlisberger to undergo a behavioral analysis.  On September 3, Goodell reduced the suspension to four games based on the results of the analysis and Roethlisberger's behavior in the interim period. Roethlisberger had been accused of sexual assault in two separate incidents in 2009 and 2010, though criminal charges were not brought against him in either case.

Practice jersey sponsor
Communications giant Comcast, the largest cable television provider in the Pittsburgh metropolitan area (as well as Pittsburgh Tri-State), signed on to place ads for its Xfinity bundled service on the Steelers' practice jerseys. (The NFL had previously allowed teams to sell ad space on the practice jerseys in 2009.) Comcast has been an official team sponsor since 2002, when Comcast entered the Pittsburgh market through its acquisition of AT&T Broadband.

Roster changes

Departed players
Unrestricted free agents (UFAs) signed by other teams
 RB Willie Parker – signed a 1-year contract with the Washington Redskins
 WR Joey Galloway – signed a 1-year contract with the Washington Redskins
 CB Deshea Townsend – signed a 1-year contract with the Indianapolis Colts
 G Darnell Stapleton – signed with the Florida Tuskers of the UFL
 S Tyrone Carter – signed with the Washington Redskins
 FB Carey Davis – signed with the Washington Redskins
 LB Rocky Boiman – signed with the Detroit Lions

Exclusive rights free agents
 LB Patrick Bailey – re-signed by Steelers; released after final pre-season game in cut-down to 53-man roster; claimed off waivers by Tennessee Titans

Players remaining unsigned
 DE Travis Kirschke

New players
Unrestricted free agents signed from other teams
 S Will Allen – played for the Tampa Bay Buccaneers in 2009
 WR Arnaz Battle – played for the San Francisco 49ers in 2009
 ILB Larry Foote – played for the Detroit Lions in 2009
 WR Antwaan Randle El – played for the Washington Redskins in 2009
 OL Jonathan Scott – played for the Buffalo Bills in 2009
 LB Renauld Williams – played for the Canadian Football League's Saskatchewan Roughriders in 2009; released after final pre-season game in cut-down to 53-man roster

Retained players
Unrestricted free agents re-signed
 QB Charlie Batch
 S Ryan Clark
 DE Nick Eason
 DT Casey Hampton
 PK Jeff Reed

Restricted free agents re-signed
Steelers made qualifying offers (tenders) which were accepted by these players, and the players were not signed by another team before the end of the restricted free agency period on April 15.  These players are therefore retained by the Steelers.
 RT Willie Colon
 CB William Gay
 P Daniel Sepulveda
 TE Matt Spaeth

Trades 
Players traded away
 WR Santonio Holmes – traded to the New York Jets for 5th round selection (#155 overall) in the 2010 NFL draft

Players added via trade
 QB Byron Leftwich – acquired from the Tampa Bay Buccaneers for 7th round draft selection (#225 overall) in the 2010 NFL draft
 CB Bryant McFadden – acquired from the Arizona Cardinals along with a 6th round selection (#195 overall) for a 5th round selection (#155 overall) in the 2010 NFL draft

2010 Draft class 

The Steelers selected ten players in the 2010 NFL Draft which took place over three days in late April.  The selections consisted of two offensive linemen, one defensive end, three linebackers, two wide receivers, a cornerback and a running back.  All of the team's draftees attended the 2010 NFL Scouting Combine.  The first round selection, Pouncey, and the wide receivers Sanders and Brown were the only selections from among the thirty players the team had brought in for pre-draft visits.

The Steelers made one trade during the draft, re-acquiring cornerback Bryant McFadden from the Arizona Cardinals.  The deal sent the fifth round selection (pick number 155) which the Steelers had acquired in the Santonio Holmes trade to the Cardinals in exchange for McFadden and a sixth round selection (pick number 195).

After the completion of the draft the team signed nine undrafted free agents.

Notes:

 from the NY Jets for Santonio Holmes
 compensatory selection
 from Arizona Cardinals with CB Bryant McFadden for pick No. 155 (24th pick of Round 6)

Undrafted free agents

Camps and Organized Team Activities (OTAs)
The Steelers official off-season training sessions were held on the following dates:

Training camp
The team's 80-man roster at the start of training camp looked like this:

Coaching staff

Final roster

Preseason

Schedule 
The Steelers preseason schedule was announced on March 31, 2010.

Regular season

Schedule 
Per the NFL's predetermined scheduling formula, the Steelers played every team in the AFC East and NFC South, the teams from the AFC South and West who finished in the same position as the Steelers in 2009 (third), and their usual AFC North division rivals.

The Steelers played a Sunday night game on October 31 against the defending Super Bowl champion New Orleans Saints in a game which conflicted with game four of baseball's World Series.  This marked the first time the NFL has scheduled a Sunday night game opposite a World Series contest that is not a seventh game.  The league explained that the decision of which game to show in this time slot was made with an eye toward minimizing the possibility that one of the competitors would be from the same market as a team participating in the World Series – New Orleans has no Major League Baseball team and the Pittsburgh Pirates were considered long shots to participate in the post-season (and indeed, they posted the worst record in Major League Baseball in 2010). There was also a feeling among the schedulers that the Steelers have a following independent of other sports. Additionally, while the Saints are the defending Super Bowl champions, the Steelers had won Super Bowl XLIII the season before. The game was considered for the NFL Kickoff game, but before the Saints eventual opponent (the Minnesota Vikings) was announced, the Steelers publicly declined the offer due to the Pirates being scheduled to play at nearby PNC Park during Weeks 2 and 3 of the Steelers season, and the fact that the two teams prefer not to play in Pittsburgh on the same day due to parking issues along Pittsburgh's North Side, where both PNC Park and Heinz Field are located. The Steelers hosted the Atlanta Falcons in their season opener instead.

The Steelers' only Monday Night Football appearance occurred on November 8 against the Cincinnati Bengals.

Although it is generally unusual to have more than two consecutive home or away games, the Steelers schedule featured three consecutive away games (weeks 7–9) and three consecutive home games (weeks 14–16).

The team brought back their throwback uniform for a fourth year.  It was worn October 17 against the Cleveland Browns and November 14 against the New England Patriots. This marked the first season since the uniforms were introduced in 2007 that the Steelers did not wear their throwback uniform against the rival Baltimore Ravens.

Note: Bold indicates division games.

Standings

Regular-season results

Week 1: vs. Atlanta Falcons

The Steelers began their season at home in an interconference duel with the Atlanta Falcons.  Pittsburgh delivered the opening punch in the first quarter as kicker Jeff Reed made a 52-yard field goal.  The Falcons would answer in the second quarter with kicker Matt Bryant making a 49-yard field goal.

Atlanta would take the lead in the third quarter with Bryant's 39-yard field goal, but Pittsburgh would tie the game on Reed's 36-yard field goal.  In the fourth quarter, the Steelers would regain the lead as Reed got a 34-yard field goal.  However, the Falcons would respond as Bryant nailed a 23-yard field goal.  In overtime, Pittsburgh made quick work of their lone possession as running back Rashard Mendenhall got the game-ending 50-yard touchdown run.

With the win, the Steelers not only began their season at 1–0, but they also picked up their eighth consecutive opening day win.

Week 2: at Tennessee Titans

Hoping to maintain their winning streak, the Steelers flew to LP Field for an AFC Duel with the Titans. The Steelers wasted no time getting the early lead when on the opening kickoff, Mewelde Moore handed the ball off to rookie wide receiver Antonio Brown, who returned it 89 yards for a touchdown. Tennessee would cut the lead when Rob Bironas nailed a 21-yard field goal. Throughout the rest of the game, Pittsburgh scored steadily with kicker Jeff Reed, who hit field goals of 36, 34, 25, and 27 yards, putting the Steelers up 19–3. The Titans finally scored a touchdown in the fourth quarter with a Kerry Collins 2-yard pass to former Steeler Nate Washington, and successfully converted the 2-point conversion and onside kick necessary to give themselves the chance to tie the game on the final drive. However, Pittsburgh's defense was able to stop Chris Johnson on a reception as the clock ran out, sealing the victory.

Starting quarterback Dennis Dixon sprained his left knee during the second quarter and was replaced by Charlie Batch, but the Steelers defense swarmed the Titans, coming up with four sacks and forcing seven turnovers, the most by Tennessee since 2000.

The Titans pulled their starting QB, Vince Young, after his third turnover. After replacing Young, Kerry Collins had two turnovers of his own.

Pittsburgh also ended Tennessee running back Chris Johnson's 100-yard rushing streak at 12 games. The NFL's rushing champion had a chance to move one game away from the league record of 14 held by Barry Sanders, but he finished with just 16 carries for 34 yards.

Steelers linebacker James Harrison had three sacks, forced a fumble and recovered another. Safety Troy Polamalu was credited for an interception and an impressive leaping tackle on Kerry Collins during an attempted goal-line stand by the Steelers to win the game and improve to 2–0.

Week 3: at Tampa Bay Buccaneers

Coming off their road win over the Titans, the Steelers flew to Raymond James Stadium for a Week 3 interconference duel with the Tampa Bay Buccaneers.  With quarterback Dennis Dixon recovering from injury, veteran quarterback Charlie Batch made his first start since Week 17 of the 2007 season.

Pittsburgh trailed early in the first quarter as Buccaneers kicker Connor Barth got a 40-yard field goal following a Batch interception.  Afterwards, the Steelers would answer as Batch completed a 46-yard touchdown pass to wide receiver Mike Wallace.  Tampa Bay would respond in the second quarter as Barth nailed a 24-yard field goal, but Pittsburgh would strike back, beginning with a 3-yard touchdown run from running back Rashard Mendenhall.  Batch would then find Wallace again on a 41-yard touchdown pass, followed by his 9-yard touchdown pass to wide receiver Hines Ward.

The Steelers would pull away in the second half as kicker Jeff Reed booted a 24-yard field goal in the third quarter, followed by defensive end Brett Keisel returning an interception 79 yards for a touchdown in the fourth quarter.  The Buccaneers would close out the game as running back LeGarrette Blount got a 1-yard touchdown run.

With the win, the Steelers got their first 3–0 start since 2007.

Week 4: vs. Baltimore Ravens

Coming off their impressive road win over the Buccaneers, the Steelers went home for an AFC North duel with the Baltimore Ravens.  Pittsburgh would deliver the opening punch in the first quarter with a 1-yard touchdown run from running back Rashard Mendenhall.  The Ravens would take the lead in the second quarter as running back Willis McGahee got a 9-yard touchdown run, followed by kicker Billy Cundiff getting a 33-yard field goal.  After a scoreless third quarter, the Steelers would regain the lead as Mendenhall picked up a 7-yard touchdown run.  However, Baltimore would get the last laugh as quarterback Joe Flacco completed an 18-yard touchdown pass to wide receiver T. J. Houshmandzadeh with 33 seconds remaining. The Steelers would get the ball back with 20 seconds remaining but quarterback Charlie Batch threw a pass that was picked off by linebacker Ray Lewis, effectively ending the game.

With the loss, Pittsburgh went into their bye week at 3–1.

Week 6: vs. Cleveland Browns

Coming off their bye week, the Steelers stayed at home, donned their throwback uniforms, and played their Week 6 AFC North duel with their archrival, the Cleveland Browns, as quarterback Ben Roethlisberger made his season debut following his four-game suspension.

Pittsburgh trailed in the first quarter as Browns kicker Phil Dawson got a 39-yard field goal.  The Steelers answered in the second quarter as Roethlisberger found wide receiver Mike Wallace on a 29-yard touchdown pass.

The Steelers added onto their lead in the third quarter as Roethlisberger connected with wide receiver Hines Ward on an 8-yard touchdown pass.  In the fourth quarter, Pittsburgh continued its dominating day as running back Rashard Mendenhall got a 2-yard touchdown run.  Cleveland tried to rally as quarterback Colt McCoy completed a 12-yard touchdown pass to tight end Benjamin Watson, but the Steelers pulled away as Roethlisberger connected with tight end Heath Miller on a 14-yard touchdown pass.

With the win, Pittsburgh improved to 4–1.

Week 7: at Miami Dolphins

Coming off their home win over the Browns, the Steelers flew to Sun Life Stadium for a Week 7 intraconference duel with the Miami Dolphins.  Pittsburgh trailed in the first quarter as Dolphins kicker Dan Carpenter made a 39-yard and a 23-yard field goal.  The Steelers took the lead in the second quarter with a 22-yard field goal from kicker Jeff Reed, followed by quarterback Ben Roethlisberger hooking up with wide receiver Hines Ward on a 21-yard touchdown pass.  Miami answered with Carpenter getting a 22-yard field goal, yet Pittsburgh came right back as Roethlisberger found wide receiver Mike Wallace on a 53-yard touchdown pass.  The Dolphins would close out the half with quarterback Chad Henne completing a 25-yard touchdown pass to wide receiver Davone Bess.

In the third quarter, the Steelers added onto their lead as Reed booted a 39-yard field goal.  Miami answered with Carpenter making a 37-yard field goal.  Miami retook the lead in the fourth quarter as Carpenter got a 40-yard field goal, yet Pittsburgh struck back as Reed got an 18-yard field goal.  The Dolphins tried to rally, but the Pittsburgh defense stiffened and held for the victory.

With the win, the Steelers improved to 5–1.

Week 8: at New Orleans Saints

Coming off their road win over the Dolphins, the Steelers flew to the Louisiana Superdome for a Week 8 interconference duel with the New Orleans Saints on Sunday night.  After a scoreless first quarter, Pittsburgh struck first in the second quarter with a 19-yard field goal from kicker Jeff Reed.  The Saints answered with a 31-yard field goal from kicker Garrett Hartley.

New Orleans took the lead as Hartley got a 23-yard field goal.  In the fourth quarter, the Saints increased their lead as quarterback Drew Brees completed a 16-yard touchdown pass to wide receiver Marques Colston.  The Steelers responded with a 38-yard touchdown run from running back Rashard Mendenhall, but New Orleans struck back with Brees completing an 8-yard touchdown pass to wide receiver Lance Moore.

With the loss, Pittsburgh fell to 5–2.

Week 9: at Cincinnati Bengals

Hoping to rebound from their road loss to the Saints, the Steelers flew to Paul Brown Stadium for a Week 9 AFC North duel with the Cincinnati Bengals on Monday night.  Pittsburgh delivered the opening strike in the first quarter as running back Rashard Mendenhall got a 1-yard touchdown run, followed by a 25-yard field goal from kicker Jeff Reed.  The Bengals answered in the second quarter as quarterback Carson Palmer completed a 19-yard touchdown pass to wide receiver Terrell Owens, yet the Steelers responded with quarterback Ben Roethlisberger hooking up with wide receiver Hines Ward on an 8-yard touchdown pass, followed by Reed's 53-yard field goal.  After a scoreless third quarter, Pittsburgh added onto their lead in the fourth quarter as wide receiver Antwaan Randle El found wide receiver Mike Wallace on a 39-yard touchdown pass.  Cincinnati tried to rally as Palmer completed a 27-yard touchdown pass to Owens, followed by running back Cedric Benson getting a 1-yard touchdown run, thanks in no small part to two consecutive penalties called against the Steelers, both of which were later deemed by the NFL to have been incorrect.  Fortunately, the defense held on to preserve the victory.

With the win, the Steelers improved to 6–2.

Week 10: vs. New England Patriots

The Steelers' ninth game was an AFC duel with the Patriots. The Steelers trailed early as QB Tom Brady made a 19-yard TD pass to TE Rob Gronkowski. This was followed by kicker Shayne Graham getting a 31-yard field goal. The Steelers responded in the second quarter with kicker Jeff Reed nailing a 22-yard field goal. The Steelers struggled further when Brady threw another TD pass to Gronkowski, this one from 9 yards out. That was followed by Brady's scramble 3 yards to the endzone for a touchdown (With a failed PAT as the kick went wide-right). The Steelers scored first in the 4th quarter when QB Ben Roethlisberger completed a 6-yard TD pass to WR Emmanuel Sanders. The Steelers looked to create another scoring drive, but it came to a halt when Roethlisberger's pass was intercepted by SS James Sanders and returned 32 yards for a touchdown (With a failed 2-point conversion). The Steelers tried to cut the lead with a Roethlisberger 15-yard TD pass to WR Mike Wallace, but the Patriots replied with Brady getting a 25-yard TD pass to Gronkowski. Again the Steelers tried to get closer when Roethlisberger completed a 33-yard TD pass to Wallace, but the Patriots put the game away after Graham hit a 36-yard field goal.

With the loss, the Steelers fell to 6–3.

Week 11: vs. Oakland Raiders

Hoping to rebound from their loss to the Patriots, the Steelers stayed at home for a Week 11 duel with the Oakland Raiders.  Pittsburgh trailed early in the first quarter as Raiders kicker Sebastian Janikowski made a 41-yard field goal. However that would turn out to be the Raiders' only points of the game. The Steelers took the lead in the second quarter with a 5-yard touchdown run from running back Rashard Mendenhall, followed by quarterback Ben Roethlisberger's 16-yard touchdown run and his 22-yard touchdown pass to rookie wide receiver Emmanuel Sanders.  After a scoreless third quarter, the Steelers added onto their lead in the fourth quarter as Roethlisberger found wide receiver Mike Wallace on a 52-yard touchdown pass.  Afterwards, Pittsburgh punctuated the game with a 16-yard touchdown pass to running back Isaac Redman.

With the win, the Steelers improved to 7–3.

Week 12: at Buffalo Bills

Coming off their win over the Raiders, the Steelers flew to Ralph Wilson Stadium for a Week 12 intraconference duel with the Buffalo Bills.  Pittsburgh delivered the opening punch in the first quarter with a 1-yard touchdown run from running back Rashard Mendenhall.  The Steelers would add onto their lead in the second quarter with a 45-yard and a 46-yard field goal from kicker Shaun Suisham.  Suisham sets the NFL record with all 4 FGs being 40+ yards & with the OT game winner.

The Bills answered in the third quarter with quarterback Ryan Fitzpatrick completing a 65-yard touchdown pass to running back Fred Jackson.  Buffalo continued to creep closer in the fourth quarter as kicker Rian Lindell got a 29-yard and a 32-yard field goal.  Pittsburgh regained the lead with Suisham's 48-yard field goal, but the Bills tied the game again with Lindell making a 49-yard field goal.  In overtime, the Steelers got the last laugh as Suisham nailed the game-ending 41-yard field goal.

With the win, Pittsburgh improved to 8–3.

Week 13: at Baltimore Ravens

Coming off their overtime win over the Bills, the Steelers flew to M&T Bank Stadium for a Week 13 AFC North rematch with the Baltimore Ravens on Sunday night.  Pittsburgh trailed in the first quarter as Ravens quarterback Joe Flacco completed a 14-yard touchdown pass to wide receiver Anquan Boldin.  After a scoreless second quarter, Pittsburgh answered in the third quarter with a 45-yard field goal from kicker Shaun Suisham.  Baltimore would respond with kicker Billy Cundiff getting a 24-yard field goal.  After adding a 19-yarder from Suisham, the Steelers defense would set up a 1st and Goal after safety Troy Polamalu stripped the ball from Ravens quarterback Joe Flacco with less than three and a half minutes to go, safety Troy Polamalu's sack on Flacco forced a fumble, allowing linebacker LaMarr Woodley to recover the ball and return it to the Baltimore 9, which was followed by quarterback Ben Roethlisberger finding running back Isaac Redman on a 9-yard touchdown pass on third down.  The Ravens tried to rally, but Pittsburgh's defense held on to prevail with the victory.

With the win, not only did the Steelers improve to 9–3, but it also allowed them to take the AFC North division lead for the first time since week 4.

Week 14: vs. Cincinnati Bengals

Coming off their win over the Ravens, the Steelers went home for a Week 14 AFC North rematch with the Cincinnati Bengals.  Pittsburgh trailed early in the first quarter as Bengals quarterback Carson Palmer completed a 1-yard touchdown pass to offensive tackle Andrew Whitworth.  The Steelers took the lead in the second quarter with safety Troy Polamalu returning an interception 45 yards for a touchdown, followed by a 23-yard field goal from kicker Shaun Suisham.

Pittsburgh increased their lead in the third quarter with Suisham's 35-yard field goal.  Afterwards, the Steelers pulled away in the fourth quarter with linebacker LaMarr Woodley returning an interception 14 yards for a touchdown, followed by Suisham booting a 41-yard field goal.

With the win, Pittsburgh improved to 10–3.

Week 15: vs. New York Jets

Coming off their win over the Bengals, the Steelers stayed at home for a Week 15 intraconference duel with the New York Jets.  Pittsburgh immediately trailed in the first quarter with Jets wide receiver/quarterback Brad Smith returning the game's opening kickoff 97 yards for a touchdown.  The Steelers answered in the second quarter with quarterback Ben Roethlisberger finding tight end Matt Spaeth on a 9-yard touchdown.  New York struck back with kicker Nick Folk making a 25-yard field goal, yet Pittsburgh tied the game with a 42-yard field goal from kicker Shaun Suisham.

The Steelers took the lead in the third quarter with a 2-yard touchdown run from running back Rashard Mendenhall, but the Jets replied with quarterback Mark Sanchez getting a 7-yard touchdown run.  New York took back their lead in the fourth quarter with Folk booting a 34-yard field goal, followed by linebacker Jason Taylor tackling running back Mewelde Moore in the endzone for a safety.  Pittsburgh tried to rally, but the Jets defense would hold on to preserve the win.

With the loss, the Steelers fell to 10–4.

Week 16: vs. Carolina Panthers

Hoping to rebound from their loss to the Jets, the Steelers stayed at home for a Week 16 interconference duel with the Carolina Panthers on Thursday night.  Pittsburgh delivered the game's opening punch in the first quarter with a 26-yard field goal from kicker Shaun Suisham.  The Steelers added onto their lead in the second quarter as Roethlisberger found wide receiver Mike Wallace on a 43-yard touchdown pass, followed by a 1-yard touchdown run from running back Rashard Mendenhall and a 29-yard field goal from Suisham.

Pittsburgh continued their dominating night in the third quarter with Roethlisberger's 1-yard touchdown run.  The Panthers would close out the game in the fourth quarter as kicker John Kasay got a 27-yard field goal.

With the win, the Steelers improved to 11–4.

Week 17: at Cleveland Browns

Coming off their win over the Panthers, the Steelers made the two-hour bus trip north to Cleveland Browns Stadium for a Week 17 AFC North rematch with the Cleveland Browns. Pittsburgh took the early lead in the first quarter as quarterback Ben Roethlisberger found wide receiver Mike Wallace on a 56-yard touchdown pass, followed by a 1-yard touchdown run from running back Rashard Mendenhall.  The Browns got on the board in the second quarter as kicker Phil Dawson got a 19-yard field goal, yet the Steelers struck back with another 1-yard touchdown run by Mendenhall, followed by Roethlisberger's 4-yard TD pass to tight end Heath Miller and kicker Shaun Suisham nailing a 41-yard field goal.

Pittsburgh added onto their lead in the third quarter as wide receiver Antwaan Randle El connected with wide receiver Hines Ward on a 3-yard touchdown pass.  Afterwards, the Steelers closed out their dominating day with Suisham's 24-yard field goal.  Cleveland closed out the game with quarterback Colt McCoy completing a 20-yard TD pass to wide receiver Brian Robiskie (with a failed two-point conversion).

With the win, not only did Pittsburgh close out their regular season at 12–4, but they also locked up the AFC's No. 2 seed.

Postseason results

Schedule

AFC Divisional Round: vs. Baltimore Ravens

Entering the postseason as the AFC's No. 2 seed, the Steelers began their playoff run at home in the AFC Divisional Round against their AFC North rival, the No. 5 Baltimore Ravens, for the third time in the season.  Pittsburgh delivered the game's opening strike in the first quarter with a 1-yard touchdown run from running back Rashard Mendenhall.  The Ravens took the lead with running back Ray Rice getting a 14-yard touchdown run, followed by defensive end Cory Redding returning a fumble 13 yards for a touchdown.  Baltimore added onto their lead in the second quarter as quarterback Joe Flacco completed a 4-yard touchdown pass to tight end Todd Heap.

The Steelers struck back to tie in the third quarter as quarterback Ben Roethlisberger found tight end Heath Miller on a 9-yard touchdown pass.  Then, he found wide receiver Hines Ward on an 8-yard touchdown pass.  Pittsburgh regained the lead in the fourth quarter with a 35-yard field goal from kicker Shaun Suisham, yet the Ravens tied the game with kicker Billy Cundiff getting a 24-yard field goal.  Afterwards, the Steelers won the game with another 1-yard touchdown run from Mendenhall.

With the win, Pittsburgh improved its overall record to 13–4. Also, with the New York Jets defeating the top-seeded New England Patriots in the divisional round the next day, Pittsburgh would get to host the AFC Championship Game.

AFC Championship Game: vs. New York Jets

Coming off their win over the Ravens, the Steelers stayed at home for the AFC Championship Game against the No. 6 New York Jets, hoping to avenge their Week 15 loss.

Pittsburgh delivered the game's opening strike with a 1-yard touchdown run from running back Rashard Mendenhall.  The Steelers added onto their lead in the second quarter with a 20-yard field goal from kicker Shaun Suisham, followed by a 2-yard touchdown run from quarterback Ben Roethlisberger, along with cornerback William Gay returning a fumble 19 yards for a touchdown.  The Jets closed out the half with kicker Nick Folk getting a 42-yard field goal.

New York began the third quarter with quarterback Mark Sanchez completing a 45-yard touchdown pass to former Pittsburgh wide receiver Santonio Holmes.  The Jets tried to rally in the fourth quarter as Roethlisberger fumbled the snap and then got tackled by Mike DeVito for a safety, followed by Sanchez completing a 4-yard touchdown pass to wide receiver Jerricho Cotchery, yet Pittsburgh held on to preserve the victory.

With the win, the Steelers improved their overall record to 14–4 while also advancing to Super Bowl XLV, where they were defeated by the NFC Champion, the Green Bay Packers.

Super Bowl XLV

This marked the Steelers' eighth appearance in a Super Bowl, tying with the Dallas Cowboys for the most appearances in Super Bowl history. They were denied their seventh ring, however, by the Green Bay Packers, who defeated them 31–25.

References

External links 
 2010 Pittsburgh Steelers season at Pro Football Reference
 2010 Pittsburgh Steelers season statistics at jt-sw.com

Pittsburgh Steelers seasons
Pittsburgh Steelers
AFC North championship seasons
American Football Conference championship seasons
2010s in Pittsburgh
2010 in sports in Pennsylvania